Crime and Punishment is a novel by Fyodor Dostoyevsky.

Crime and Punishment may also refer to:

Film

 Raskolnikow (film), a 1923 German film directed by Robert Wiene
 Crime and Punishment (1917 film), an American silent crime drama film
 Crime and Punishment (1935 American film), a 1935 film directed by Josef von Sternberg
 Crime and Punishment (1935 French film), a 1935 French crime drama
 Crime and Punishment (1945 film), a Swedish film
 Crime and Punishment (1951 film), a 1951 Mexican film
 Crime and Punishment (1956 film), a French crime film
 Crime and Punishment U.S.A., a 1959 American film directed by Denis Sanders
 Crime and Punishment (1970 film), a 1970 Soviet film in two parts directed by Lev Kulidzhanov
 Crime and Punishment (1983 film), a 1983 Finnish film directed by Aki Kaurismäki
 Crime and Punishment (1998 film), a 1998 television film directed by Joseph Sargent
 Crime and Punishment in Suburbia, a 2000 film directed by Rob Schmidt
 Crime and Punishment (2002 Russian film), a 2002 film directed by Menahem Golan
 Crime + Punishment, an American documentary that received a Special Jury Award at the 2018 Sundance Film Festival

Television
 Crime and Punishment, a 1979 BBC production starring John Hurt and Timothy West
 Crime & Punishment (1993 TV series), a 1993 NBC police drama series created by Dick Wolf
 Crime and Punishment (2002 TV series), a 2002 British television film directed by Julian Jarrold starring John Simm
 Crime & Punishment, a 2002 television spin-off of the Law & Order franchise
 Tony Robinson's Crime and Punishment, a 2008 British documentary series

Episodes
 "Crime and Punishment" (Brooklyn Nine-Nine)
 "Crime and Punishment" (Dawson's Creek)
 "Crime and Punishment" (Private Practice)
 "Crime and Punishment" (Roseanne)
 "Crime and Punishment" (Supergirl)

Other
 Crime and Punishment (play), a 2007 play by Marilyn Campbell and Curt Columbus
 Crime and Punishment (video game), a 1984 legal simulation game released for the Commodore 64 and MS-DOS
 Sherlock Holmes: Crimes & Punishments, a 2014 video game
 On Crimes and Punishments, a 1764 treatise on legal reform by Cesare Beccaria
 Crime and Punishment (manga), a 1953 manga series based on Dostoyevsky's novel by Osamu Tezuka
 Crime and Punishment: A Falsified Romance, a 2007 manga adaptation of Dostoyevsky's novel by Naoyuki Ochiai
 National Museum of Crime & Punishment, in Washington, D.C.